Waldemar Ciesielczyk (31 October 1958 – 18 June 2010) was a Polish fencer. He competed in the team foil event at the 1988 Summer Olympics.

References

1958 births
2010 deaths
Polish male fencers
Olympic fencers of Poland
Fencers at the 1988 Summer Olympics
Sportspeople from Poznań